Teodor-Dacian Crăciun (born June 6, 1980) is a Romanian tennis player. He reached his highest ATP singles ranking of World No. 218 in March 2007.

Crăciun plays with both one-handed and two-handed backhands depending on the shot. He usually rallies with two hands and hits angles/passing shots with one hand.

ATP Challenger Tour finals

Singles finals: 1 (0–1)

Doubles finals: 4 (1–3)

References

External links

 
 

1980 births
Living people
Romanian male tennis players
21st-century Romanian people